The 2001–02 Brown Bears women’s ice hockey team represented Brown University. The Bears qualified for their first NCAA Frozen Four title game.

Regular season
 December 8–9: Kristy Zamora registered four points in Brown's two games. She had an assist in the Saturday loss to the Northeastern Huskies women's ice hockey program. The Huskies prevailed 2–1. Zamora got the assist on the Bears goal scored by Jessica Link. On Sunday, December 9, Zamora got a hat trick as the Bears beat the Providence Friars women's ice hockey program by a 4–0 score. Two of her goals were scored in the third period in a twenty-five second span. It was Zamora's first hat trick of the season. The last hat trick (registered in 2001) also came against the Friars in February 2001.

Notable players
 Courtney Johnson served as assistant captain while ranking fourth on the Bears in points. She had nine goals, twenty-seven assists (good for second on the team) and 36 total points.

Player stats

Skaters

Goaltenders

Awards and honors
 Pam Dreyer, 2002 ECAC Tournament Most Valuable Player,
 Kim Fleet, Chelsea McMillan Award for pride and perseverance
 Kim Fleet, Sakuma Award winner for perfect attendance at all practices and games.
 Courtney Johnson, 2002 ECAC All Academic Team
 Courtney Johnson, 2002 Academic All-Ivy
 Courtney Johnson, US College Hockey Online Player of the Week (Jan. 14, 2002)
 Jessica Link, 2002 ECAC All-Rookie Team
 Jessica Link, 2002 Second Team All-Ivy honors
 Jessica Link, ECAC Rookie of the Week (Jan. 28, 2002)
 Jessica Link, 2002 Kate Silver Award, recognizing her as the outstanding first year female varsity athlete at Brown University
 Jessica Link, 2002 Sakuma Award winner.
 Kristy Zamora, ECAC Player of the Week (Awarded December 11)

Ivy League honors
 Kristy Zamora, Forward, Senior, 2002 First Team All-Ivy League
 Cassie Turner, Defense, Junior, 2002 First Team All-Ivy League
 Katie Germain, Goalie, Sophomore, 2002 First Team All-Ivy League
 Jessica Link, Forward, Freshman, 2002 Second Team All-Ivy League
 Meredith Ostrander, Defense, Senior, 2002 All-Ivy League Honorable Mention
 Kristy Zamora, Brown, 2002 Ivy League Player of the Year

NCAA All-Tournament Team
 Meredith Ostrander, Defense
 Kristy Zamora, Forward
 Kristy Zamora, NCAA Tournament Most Outstanding Player

Frozen Four

References

External links
 Official site

Brown Bears women's ice hockey seasons
NCAA women's ice hockey Frozen Four seasons
Brown
Brown
Brown